Melba toast is a dry, crisp and thinly sliced rusk, often served with soup and salad or topped with either melted cheese or pâté. It is named after Dame Nellie Melba, the stage name of Australian opera singer Helen Porter Mitchell. Its name is thought to date from 1897, when the singer was very ill and it became a staple of her diet. The toast was created for her by a chef who was also a fan of her, Auguste Escoffier, who also created the Peach Melba dessert for her. The hotel proprietor César Ritz supposedly named it in a conversation with Escoffier.

Melba toast is made by lightly toasting slices of bread under a grill, on both sides. The resulting toast is then sliced laterally. These thin slices are then returned to the grill with the untoasted sides towards the heat source, resulting in toast half the normal thickness. Thus, it can be described as a thrice-baked food (see rusk).

Melba toast is also available commercially, and was at one time given to infants who were teething as a hard food substance on which to chew.

In France, it is referred to as croutes en dentelle.

History
In 1925, the Mayo Brothers prescribed the "Eighteen Day Reducing Diet" to Ethel Barrymore. It included Melba toast, which made the toast very popular at the time.

See also

 List of breads
 List of foods named after people
 List of toast dishes
 List of twice-baked foods
 Mrs. Cubbison's Foods
 Old London Foods

References

Breads
Twice-baked goods
Toast dishes
Nellie Melba